Sinkane (born Ahmed Abdullahi Gallab  in London, England) is a Sudanese-American musician who blends krautrock, prog rock, electronica, free jazz and funk rock with Sudanese pop. He is signed to City Slang Records.

Born to college professors in London, he lived in Sudan, then moved to the US when he was five, and lived for some time in Ohio. Prior to embarking on his solo career, he worked with Eleanor Friedberger, Caribou, of Montreal, Born Ruffians, and Yeasayer as a session musician.

Ahmed Gallab is the vocalist and music director of the Atomic Bomb! Band which plays the music of Nigerian funk musician William Onyeabor. The group includes David Byrne (of Talking Heads), Money Mark (of the Beastie Boys), Damon Albarn (of Blur and Gorillaz), Dev Hynes (aka Blood Orange and Lightspeed Champion), Alexis Taylor (of Hot Chip), Charles Lloyd, Amadou and Mariam, Jamie Lidell, Pharoah Sanders, Joshua Redman, among many many others.

On 10 February 2017 Sinkane released their sixth album Life & Livin' It on City Slang.

On 6 March 2017 Sinkane made their television network debut on Conan.

On 16 September 2019 Sinkane made their aquatic network debut on FishCenter Live.

Discography
 Sinisterals (2007)
 Color Voice (2008) (Emergency Umbrella)
 Sinkane (2009) (Emergency Umbrella)
 Mars (2012) (DFA, City Slang) Engineered and Mixed by Albert Di Fiore
 Mean Love (DFA, City Slang, 2014) Engineered and Mixed by Albert Di Fiore
 Life & Livin' It (City Slang, February 10, 2017)
 Dépaysé (City Slang, May 31, 2019)
 Gettin' Weird (Alive at Spacebomb Studios) (Spacebomb Records, Oct 25, 2019)

References

External links
 DFA Records link to recent album
 Artists You Should Know KCRW

Living people
DFA Records artists
American rock singers
American experimental musicians
Sudanese emigrants to the United States
Musicians from London
Musicians from Columbus, Ohio
Singers from Ohio
American synth-pop musicians
American electronic musicians
21st-century American singers
Year of birth missing (living people)
Atomic Bomb! Band members